Norman Richardson may refer to:

 Norman Richardson (basketball), American basketball player
 Norman Richardson (footballer), English footballer
 Norman L. Richardson, American journalist
 Norm Richardson (footballer) (1882–1949), Australian rules footballer